Giovanni Cantagalli (11 January 1914 – 2 September 2008) was an Italian hammer thrower who competed at the 1936 Summer Olympics.

Biography
After World War II he emigrated with his wife to Panama where he worked as a neuropsychiatrist, country when he died in 2008 at age of 94,  .

National titles
Italian Athletics Championships
Hammer throw: 1935, 1936, 1937, 1938

References

External links
 

1914 births
2008 deaths
Sportspeople from Mantua
Athletes (track and field) at the 1936 Summer Olympics
Italian male hammer throwers
Olympic athletes of Italy